The Bert and John Hobbins House is a private house located at 1024 Emmet Street in Petoskey, Michigan. It was placed on the National Register of Historic Places in 1986.

The Bert and John Hobbins House is a two-story frame Colonial Revival structure. It has an L-shaped plan, with  the short gable-roofed leg of the L facing the front. A one-story wing extends to the rear. A single-story hip roof porch supported by Doric columns fills the angle between the legs of the L. The walls are clad with clapboards, and the windows are topped by a simple cornice.

The house is associated with Bert and John Hobbins, who lived here in the late 1890s, along with John's wife. Bert Hobbins was a clerk at Wellington & Co., and John was a clerk at Milor & Co. By 1903, Jesse Marvin, a sawyer, was living in this house. By 1928, William Behm was the owner.

References

Houses on the National Register of Historic Places in Michigan
Colonial Revival architecture in Michigan
Emmet County, Michigan